Bo lei may refer to:

Lei Bo (雷薄), a military officer serving under the Eastern Han dynasty warlord Yuan Shu
Bolei tea, a Cantonese pronunciation for Pu-erh tea